Zhou Ping or Zhouping may refer to:

King Ping of Zhou or Zhou Ping Wang (died 720 BC), king of the Zhou dynasty
Zhou Ping (gymnast) (born 1968), Chinese gymnast
Zhouping, Zhuzhou, a township in Hunan Province, China
Zhouping Xin ( 1988–2004), Chinese mathematician

See also
Ping Zhou (researcher), researcher with ANSYS
Zhou Pingjian ( 2016), Chinese ambassador to Nigeria